SS City of Brooklyn was a steam ship built in Glasgow in 1868 by Tod & McGregor. She was initially owned and operated by the Inman Line. She was used on sailings between Liverpool and New York. She was wrecked on 8 November 1885 on Anticosti Island. There were no deaths.

References

1868 ships
Ships built in Glasgow
Steamships of the United Kingdom
Shipwrecks in the Gulf of Saint Lawrence
Ships built on the River Clyde
Maritime incidents in November 1885